Neurophysiotherapy, or neurological physiotherapy, is a branch of physiotherapy which treats motor deficits arising from pathology in the nervous system.

See also
Bobath concept
Frenkel exercises

References

Physical therapy